The Mildef Rentaka 4x4 is a Malaysian 4x4 reconnaissance vehicle designed and manufactured by Mildef International Technologies or Mildef. It is the second armoured vehicle developed by Mildef after Mildef Tarantula HMAV.

History
Rentaka first unveiled at the Defence Services Asia (DSA) 2022 exhibition held in Kuala Lumpur. It is named by the King of Malaysia, Sultan Abdullah at the vehicle's launch ceremony. Mildef has designed and developed its Rentaka for military and paramilitary operations which is suitable for the uses of armed force and police.

The Rentaka has a length of 6.2 meter, a width of 2.4 meter and a height of 2.5 meter. It is 8.8 tonnes in weight and powered by a 330 hp V8 turbo diesel engine. The vehicle equipped with one 12.7mm RCWS and can accommodate 10 personnel. According to the company, due to the modular design of the vehicle, the other versions of the Rentaka could be offered such as weapon carriers and artillery prime movers.

See also 

 Mildef Tarantula, APC/MRAP made by Mildef

References

All-wheel-drive vehicles
Military vehicles of Malaysia
Armoured fighting vehicles of Malaysia
Military vehicles introduced in the 2020s